Dam Bagh Yusefabad (also Romanized as Dam Bāgh Yūsefābād; also known as Dom Bāgh, Dam Bāgh, Dambākh, Dom Bākh-e Vasaţ, and Dūmbākh) is a village in Mirbag-e Jonubi Rural District, in the Central District of Delfan County, Lorestan Province, Iran. At the 2006 census, its population was 703, in 157 families.

References 

Towns and villages in Delfan County